The Florida Trail Association is a private non-profit organization founded in 1953 that oversees the volunteer effort to build, maintain, protect and promote the Florida Trail, one of eleven National Scenic Trails in the United States. Based in Gainesville, the Florida Trail Association's mission also includes:

 Building and maintaining hiking trails on other public lands.
 Providing educational opportunities for people to learn to appreciate and conserve the natural beauty of Florida.
 Providing recreational opportunities for hiking and camping.

With 19 local chapters dispersed geographically throughout Florida, the Florida Trail Association draws on local support to build and maintain hiking trails, to provide guided outdoor recreation opportunities for the public, and to work with landowners to acquire protected natural lands to ensure a quality hiking experience for hikers on the Florida Trail corridor.

The Florida Trail Association works directly in concert with the federal land manager of the Florida Trail, the USDA Forest Service, to facilitate the acquisition of land, to direct volunteer efforts, and to provide public outreach.

History 
The Florida Trail Association's main building was badly damaged by Hurricane Gloria in 1985.

References 

 Florida Greenways & Trails Guide
 Visit Florida

External links
 Local chapters of the Florida Trail Association
 Official page

Hiking organizations in the United States
Organizations based in Florida
1964 establishments in Florida